Stephanie M. Cardona (born June 3, 1992), better known by the ring name Red Velvet, is a Colombian-American professional wrestler and dancer. She is currently signed to All Elite Wrestling (AEW).

Professional wrestling career

Independent circuit (2016–2021) 
Velvet began training at Fighting Evolution Wrestling (FEW) under JB Cool, based in Miami, Fl, in 2015. She made her in-ring debut, under the ring name Red Velvett, on March 24, 2016, in a singles match against Rebel, in a losing effort. On August 19, 2016, Velvet won the FEW Women's Championship in a triple threat match against Jade and Rebel. On January 21, 2017, Velvet lost the title to Lea Nox. On November 2, 2018, she made her SHINE debut against Avery Taylor, which she was pinned.

All Elite Wrestling (2020–present) 
On June 10, 2020, Velvet made her All Elite Wrestling debut on AEW Dark, facing Allie and Brandi Rhodes in a tag team match, which she lost. On the June 24 episode of AEW Dynamite, Velvet made her Dynamite debut and faced Hikaru Shida which Velvet lost via pinfall. On October 13, Velvet won her first match in AEW on AEW Dark against Elayna Black by pinning her. On the December 9 episode of AEW Dynamite Jade Cargill attacked Velvet backstage. On January 27, 2021, it was then announced that Velvet and Cody Rhodes will be taking on Jade Cargill and Shaquille O'Neal in a mixed tag team match on the March 3 episode of Dynamite titled The Crossroads. The team of Cody Rhodes and Velvet lost to Jade Cargill and Shaquille O'Neal by Jade Cargill winning via pinfall. On March 25, it was announced that Velvet signed a full-time contract with All Elite Wrestling. On the May 19 episode of Dynamite, Velvet faced Serena Deeb for the NWA World Women's Championship which Velvet lost by submission. On August 13 Velvet challenged Britt Baker for the AEW Women's World Championship on the debut show AEW Rampage which they were the main event of, Velvet lost by submission. On November 5 episode of Rampage Velvet took part in the AEW women's TBS championship tournament where she faced The Bunny and won making her advance to the next round. On the November 19 episode of Rampage Velvet competed in the second round of the tournament facing Jade Cargill which Velvet lost to. On April 8, 2022, on Rampage, Velvet participated in the AEW Owen Hart Cup facing Willow Nightingale in the qualifying round where she won advancing to the next round. On April 13, on Dynamite Velvet became a part of The Baddies stable which includes her, Kiera Hogan and Jade Cargill, establishing herself as a heel for the first time in her career. On May 20 on Rampage Velvet faced Kris Statlander in the quarter finals of the Owen Hart Cup where she lost. On June 22 it was revealed on Dynamite that Velvet had sustained an injury. Velvet made her return to AEW television on the November 23 episode of Dynamite.

Personal life 
Cardona is of Colombian descent. She is the daughter of the Colombian World Flyweight boxing champion, Prudencio Cardona. However, as of July 2022, she is in a relationship with Chandler Hopkins.

Filmography

Television

Championships and accomplishments 
 Fighting Evolution Wrestling
 FEW Women's Championship (1 time)
 Pro Wrestling Illustrated
 Ranked No. 112 of the top 150 female wrestlers in the PWI Women's 150 in 2022

References

External links 
 

1991 births
Living people
African-American female professional wrestlers
All Elite Wrestling personnel
American female professional wrestlers
American sportspeople of Colombian descent
Colombian female professional wrestlers
Professional wrestlers from Florida
Sportspeople from Miami
21st-century African-American sportspeople
21st-century African-American women
Afro-Colombian women
21st-century professional wrestlers